Novial is a constructed international auxiliary language (IAL) for universal human communication between speakers of different native languages.  It was devised by Otto Jespersen, a Danish linguist who had been involved in the Ido movement that evolved from Esperanto at the beginning of the 20th century, and participated later in the development of Interlingua. The name means 'new' + 'international auxiliary language'.

Its vocabulary is based largely on the Germanic and Romance languages while its grammar is influenced by English.

Novial was introduced in Jespersen's book An International Language in 1928. It was updated in his dictionary Novial Lexike in 1930, and further modifications were proposed in the 1930s, but the language became dormant with Jespersen's death in 1943. In the 1990s, with the revival of interest in constructed languages brought on by the Internet, some people rediscovered Novial.

Phonology

Consonants

Vowels

Stress
The basic rule is: stress the vowel before the last consonant. However, consonantal flexional endings (ie. -d, -m, -n, -s) do not count for this (eg.  but , not ;  but , not ) so perhaps it is better to say that the vowel before the final consonant of the stem takes the stress.

Orthography

Grammar
Like many constructed IALs, Novial has a simple and regular grammar. The main word order is SVO, which removes the need for marking the object of a sentence with accusative case (since the position normally tells what word is the object). There is however a way to mark accusative. There is no grammatical gender (but the sex or gender of referrents can be marked). Verbs are conjugated without agreement (according to person or number), and have a regular conjugation.

Nouns mainly end in e, a, o, u or um in singular. There is definite forms of nouns marked with an article, and singular and plural forms, where plural is marked with the suffix  after vowels or  after consonants. There is also a form for indefinite number (like in Mandarin Chinese and Japanese, for example), expressed by removing the ending of the noun in singular ( – lion,  – 'a/the lion is cruel', or 'lions are cruel').

The third person pronouns follows the same rule, together with the definite article.

Personal pronouns, subject and object

The standard word order in Novial is subject–verb–object, as in English. Therefore, the object need not be marked to distinguish it from the subject, and nominative (I, he, she and so on) and oblique (me, him, her) pronouns are identical:

The accusative (direct object) is therefore most often identical to the nominative (subject). However, in case of an ambiguity problem, an optional accusative ending,  ( after a consonant), is available but is rarely used. The preposition  is equivalent to this ending.

The personal possessive adjectives are formed from the pronouns by adding  or after a consonant . This is in fact the genitive (possessive) of the pronoun so  means both 'my' and 'mine' ('of me'):

The reflexive pronoun is :  – 'he admires himself'.

Verbs
Verb forms never change with person or number. Most verb tenses, moods and voices are expressed with auxiliary verbs preceding the root form of the main verb. The auxiliaries follow the same word order as the English equivalent. The following phrases give examples of the verb forms:

 Present active participle:  – 'protecting'
 Past passive participle:  – 'protected'

Novial clearly distinguishes the passive of becoming and the passive of being.  In English the forms are often the same, using the auxiliary verb to be followed by the past participle. However, the passive of becoming is also often expressed with the verb to get which is used in the examples below.

The passive voice of becoming is formed with the auxiliary  followed by the root verb form. It can then be conjugated into the previously mentioned forms, for example:

The passive voice of being is formed with the auxiliary  followed by the past passive participle (stem + -t). For example:

Articles
It is used as in English.

There is no indefinite article, although  ('one') can be used.

Nouns
The plural noun is formed by adding  to the singular ( after a consonant).

The accusative case is generally identical to the nominative but can optionally be marked with the ending  ( after a consonant) with the plural being  ( after a consonant) or with the preposition .

The genitive is formed with the ending  ( after a consonant) with the plural being  ( after a consonant) or with the preposition .

Other cases are formed with prepositions.

Adjectives
Adjectives precede the noun qualified. Adjectives do not agree with the noun but may be given noun endings if there is no noun present to receive them.

Comparative adjectives are formed by placing various particles (and ) in front of the adjective receiving the comparison. Likewise, the superlative particles ( and ) precede the adjective. The adjective does not receive an inflection to its ending.

Adverbs
An adjective is converted to a corresponding adverb by adding  after the  ending of the adjective.

Comparative and superlative adverbs are formed in the same manner as comparative and superlative adjectives: by placing a specific particle before the adverb receiving the comparison.

Vocabulary

Affixes
See the Table of Prefixes and Table of Suffixes at the Novial Wikibook.

Novial compared to Esperanto and Ido

Jespersen was a professional linguist, unlike Esperanto's creator. He disliked the arbitrary and artificial character that he found in Esperanto and Ido. Additionally, he objected to those languages' inflectional systems, which he found needlessly complex. He sought to make Novial at once euphonious and regular while also preserving useful structures from natural languages.

In Novial:
 Syntax is largely a matter of word order, as in English and modern Scandinavian languages. There is no obligatory accusative marker as in Esperanto, but the accusative may optionally be marked with either an accusative ending or an accusative preposition.
 A genitive or possessive case is available as an alternative to the preposition . This is based on Jespersen's observation that many modern languages have lost complex noun inflections, yet retain a possessive form.
 Auxiliary particles express most verb tenses. An inflectional ending is available as a shorthand for the simple past tense.

A major difference between Novial and Esperanto/Ido concerns noun endings. Jespersen rejected a single vowel to terminate all nouns (-o in Esperanto/Ido), finding it unnatural and potentially confusing. These endings may be taken to indicate natural sex according to the custom in Romance languages. Also there is no grammatical gender or requirement for adjectives to agree with nouns.

Language sample for comparison
Here is the Lord's Prayer in Novial and several related languages:

Criticism
As Jespersen relates in his autobiography, in 1934 he proposed an orthographic reform to Novial, which displeased a part of the users. Jespersen abandoned the essential principle of one sound, one letter :

Some of Jespersen's colleagues among philologists jokingly referred to Novial as Jesperanto, combining his surname with Esperanto, the prototypical auxiliary language.

See also
 Comparison between Esperanto and Novial
 Comparison between Ido and Novial

Notes

References

External links

  A summary of 1928 Novial
 A summary of the 1930 version
 Novial’98
 Novial Lexike: International Dictionary by Otto Jespersen, 1930
 Discussiones inter E. de Wahl e O. Jespersen

 
Constructed languages
Constructed languages introduced in the 1920s
1928 introductions